George Sherwood (May 29, 1811 – ??) was a judge, lawyer and political figure in Canada West.

Family and early life 

Sherwood was born in Augusta Township in 1811, the son of Levius Peters Sherwood and Charlotte Sherwood, daughter of Ephraim Jones.  He was of United Empire Loyalist stock on both sides of his family.  His older brother, Henry Sherwood, later became Joint Premier of the Province of Canada.

George Sherwood studied law and was called to the bar in 1833, as a barrister at law.  The same year he married Marianne Keegan, originally from Nova Scotia.  He set up practice in Prescott, originally in partnership with his brother Henry.

Later career 

Elected a bencher of the Law Society of Upper Canada in 1849, Sherwood was named Queen's Counsel in 1856.  A member of the Church of England, Sherwood donated land valued at £25 for the  foundation of Trinity College, an Anglican college in Toronto.

Sherwood was an officer in the local militia, and eventually reached the position of lieutenant-colonel, commanding the 1st Battalion of the Leeds militia.  He was also a director of the Brockville and Ottawa Railway.

In his later years, Sherwood was a warden of the Anglican church in Brockville.

Political career 

The Sherwoods were part of the Family Compact, the inter-connected families of strong British and Loyalist sympathies which dominated the government of Upper Canada in the early years of the 19th century.  When he first entered politics in the general election of 1841, George Sherwood was associated with the Upper Canada Tories.  Although he supported the union of Upper Canada and Lower Canada into the new Province of Canada, he was a critic of the Governor General, Lord Sydenham, in the 1841 election.  The Tories disagreed with the Governor General's policy of seeking a broad-base of support in the Legislative Assembly, including Reformers, rather than drawing support solely from the Family Compact, as previous governors of Upper Canada had done.

Sherwood successfully stood for election for the electoral district of Brockville in the 1841 general election for the 1st Parliament of the Province of Canada.  He was re-elected in the elections of 1844 and 1848, but defeated in the general elections of 1851 and 1854. He was re-elected in the general election of 1857 and served in Parliament until 1863.

In 1845, Sherwood was appointed a commissioner to review the management of public works in the Province.  By 1858 he was a supporter of the Liberal-Conservative party, and entered Cabinet that year in the John A. Macdonald–George-Étienne Cartier ministry.  He served from 1858 to 1862 as Receiver General, and was an ex officio member of the Board of Railway Commissioners.  He held those positions until March, 1862, when he became Commissioner of Crown Lands.  He resigned from Cabinet in May, 1862.

Judicial career 

In 1865, he was appointed judge of the County Court for Hastings County, a position he held until his death.  As a judge, he was reported to be "courteous, cool and impartial".

References 

1811 births
Members of the Legislative Assembly of the Province of Canada from Canada West
Canadian judges
Year of death missing
Canadian King's Counsel
19th-century Canadian judges